Ahfaz-ur-Rahman (born 4 April 1942 – 12 April 2020), was a Pakistani journalist, writer and poet. He struggled for the freedom of the press and for the rights of journalists.

Rahman was the author of many books including books on the journalist movement against the military dictatorship of Zia-ul-Haq in Pakistan, collections of articles on international dissidents, and collections of poetry. He also translated several books into Urdu. He died on 12 April 2020 in Karachi, Pakistan.

Personal life

Background

Rahman was born in Jabalpur, India in 1942. He  along with his family migrated to Pakistan in 1947. During his secondary education, he won prizes for his writings. He was inspired by Sahir Ludhyanvi, Krishan Chander and other stalwarts of the Progressive Writers' Movement since his early years. He became a student leader of the left-wing student organization, National Students Federation (NSF) and took part in 1962 and 1964 student uprisings against General Ayub Khan's regime. In 1969, he went to work in the Foreign Languages Press in Beijing, China, during the Cultural Revolution.

Activism

Rahman began his activism upon returning to Pakistan from China at the end of 1972. During the Zia ul Haq regime he organized the movement for the freedom of the press. He was one of the three journalists who went underground to continue the movement, and eventually also went to prison. The movement had started in 1977, when the Daily Musawaat in Karachi, a newspaper with Pakistan Peoples Party (PPP) leanings, was banned by General Zia's government.

In December 1977, journalists from all over the country came to Karachi to offer court arrest in batches. Rahman was the first journalist to be arrested in the first batch. From 30 April 1978 to 30 May 1978, more than 120 journalists who came from various cities to court arrest in Lahore were arrested and sent to different jails of the Punjab province. Rahman was again among the first to be arrested and sent to Camp Jail. Later he was taken out of jail and debarred from the Punjab province for six months.

In July 1978 journalists from all corners came to Karachi for court arrest and were sent to different jails of the Sindh province. In the meantime, Rahman went underground to organize batches consisting of journalists, workers, peasants and student volunteers for court arrest.

After the movement ended, Rahman was blacklisted by all major newspapers and magazines, as a result he faced economic difficulties due to a long period of unemployment. Finally in 1985, he found employment in the Foreign Language Press in Beijing China, for which he had worked sixteen years earlier.

Journalistic career
After returning to Pakistan in 1993, with the Zia era over, Rahman joined Daily Jang, the largest selling Urdu newspaper in Pakistan, as the magazine editor.
In 2002, he was elected unopposed President of the Pakistan Federal Union of Journalists (PFUJ), which is the sole representative body of Pakistani journalists.

As the president of the PFUJ he protested against the newspaper and media house owners for not giving the workers their due rights and for not implementing the Wage Board Award as had been directed by the Government.
He was terminated from services for his outspoken activism.
After yet another period of unemployment, Rahman found a job in the Urdu newspaper Daily Express. He also wrote a weekly column that appeared on Sundays in Daily Express, titled "Black and White" (Syaah o Safaid).
In November 2007, Rahman was among the first journalists to be arrested during the protests against the Musharraf government's decision to ban several media channels.
Rahman worked to "revitalize" the Karachi Press Club and "condemned the opportunist elements that were bent upon de-politicizing the vibrant club".

In February 2008, in what was a first in the history of Pakistani literature, four of his newly published books were launched at Arts Council Karachi on the same day in a well-attended ceremony that attracted people, including poets, writers, journalists, trade unionists and activists.

At the sixth International Urdu Conference that took place at the Karachi Arts Council in November 2013, a new collection of Rahman's poetry, titled Zinda Hai Zindagi ("Life, it is alive!") was launched. Leading poet and feminist Fehmida Riaz spoke on the occasion and said, "His poetry is an engaging account of our collective yearnings for what this nation has yet to achieve." Zahida Hina and Shamim Hanfi also spoke on the occasion, about Rahman's literary works. Senior writer and Man Booker International Prize nominee for 2013, Intizar Hussain in his review of the collection, opined that through his poetry Rahman is "searching for hope amid despair".

In 2015, Rahman wrote and compiled a book about the historic press freedom movement against the Zia-ul-Haq dictatorship. The book launching event was attended by the intellectual "creme de la creme" of Karachi. The book chronicles the movement for the freedom of the press by journalists in 1977-78 when journalists were incarcerated and flogged for their struggle for freedom of the press and unhindered information by then-president General Zia ul Haq and his coterie. Writing in Dawn's "Books and Authors", noted journalist Muhammad Ali Siddiqi, said that "the book is an important addition to the meagre literature available on the fourth estate in Pakistan".

In newspapers as
 Group Magazine Editor, Express 2005-2018 
 Executive Editor Daily Amn, 2004–2005
 Group Magazine Editor, Daily Jang 1993-2003

Professional trade unionism
 Member Executive Council National Students Federation (NSF), Pakistan

Memorial Award
In 2022 the Rahman family in collaboration with the Ahfaz ur Rahman Award Organizing Committee and the Karachi Arts Council, created the Ahfaz ur Rahman Award for Courage and Freedom of Expression. The list of jury members comprises distinguished intellectuals and activists, who will decide on the awardees each year.

In 2022, the lifetime achievement award was presented to Mr. Amar Jaleel, the fearless writer and journalist for his steadfastness in raising his dissenting voice through his writings in Sindhi, Urdu and English. The contemporary award was presented to the courageous journalist Ms. Asma Shirazi who has garnered a justly honorable reputation for her principled reporting and analysis amid a barrage of unscrupulous attacks.

Selected bibliography
Poetry
 Zinda Hai Zindagi, a collection of poems 

Journalism
 Jang Jari Rahegi, a collection or newspaper articles broadly on anti-imperialist and anti-war themes, including profile pieces on John Lennon, Bob Dylan, Justice Kiyani etc.
Historical
 Sab Say Bari Jang: A book about 1977-78 movement for Press Freedom. 
Original Urdu Work
  30 short stories in literary magazines

See also

List of Pakistani journalists
List of Pakistani poets
List of Pakistani writers
List of Urdu poets
List of Urdu writers

References

Activist journalists
Chinese–Urdu translators
Muhajir people
Pakistani expatriates in China
Pakistani male journalists
Pakistani translators
2020 deaths
1942 births
Urdu-language poets from Pakistan
Journalists from Karachi
Writers from Karachi
Pakistani socialists
Pakistani Marxists